Eugène Louis Melchior Patrin (3 April 1742, Lyon – 15 August 1815, Saint-Vallier) was a French mineralogist and naturalist.

Following two years of travels in Germany, Hungary and Poland, he spent eight years in Russia (Siberia) (1780–87), conducting geological and botanical investigations. He extensively travelled the Urals, the Altai Mountains and other areas of Siberia, with his mineral collections being shipped back to St. Petersburg ahead of his return. This material, however, was partially confiscated by Pyotr Simon Pallas, who kept the best items for his personal cabinet. Patrin's remaining pieces were subsequently offered to the  collection in Paris, provided that the group not be broken up.

He made important contributions regarding the "mineralogy section" of Buffon's massive work on natural history, "". In 1788 he provided a modern description of aurichalcite, giving it the name . The plant genus Patrinia (family Valerianaceae) was named in his honor by Antoine Laurent de Jussieu.

Selected works 
 , (1783).
 , (1790).
 , (1800).
 , etc. (1830).

References

1742 births
1815 deaths
Deputies to the French National Convention
French mineralogists
French naturalists
Corresponding members of the Saint Petersburg Academy of Sciences
Scientists from Lyon